James Neely Allison (May 14, 1902 - February 21, 1970) was an American football player in the National Football League.

Life
Born in Ballinger, Texas, Allison played college football for the Texas A&M Aggies. He played professionally for the Buffalo Rangers (1926), the Buffalo Bisons (1927), and the New York Giants (1928).  Allison played as an end and wore number 11. Allison scored one touchdown in 1926.

References

External links
 Neely Allison at NFL.com

1902 births
1970 deaths
People from Ballinger, Texas
Texas A&M Aggies football players
Buffalo Rangers players
Buffalo Bisons (NFL) players
New York Giants players